{{DISPLAYTITLE:C63H111N11O12}}
The molecular formula C63H111N11O12 (molar mass: 1214.622 g/mol) may refer to:

 Valspodar (PSC833)
 Voclosporin

Molecular formulas